Vladimir Moiseyev may refer to:

 Vladimir Aleksandrovich Moiseyev (born 1988), Russian footballer
 Vladimir Moiseyev (windsurfer), Russian windsurfer